Historical forgery may refer to:

Archaeological forgery, the creation of false artifacts
Literary forgery, in the context of the creation of false or misattributed historical texts
Pious forgery, either of the above in ecclesiastical contexts

See also
Relic

it:Falso storico